The Swedish psychologist and university professor Heinz Leymann developed the LIPT questionnaire. LIPT stands for Leymann Inventory of Psychological Terror.

Structure 
The LIPT questionnaire lists 45 mobbing actions at the workplace. A person is regarded as being bullied if one or more of the 45 actions happen at least once per week over a period of at least one year. Alternative mobbing definitions require a shorter period of at least 3–6 months and the frequent occurrence of more than one action.

The effects of the actions on the mobbing victim are divided into five categories:

 Effects on self-expression and communication, e.g., the mobbing victim is constantly interrupted, criticized, or yelled at.
 Effects on social contacts, e.g., colleagues and coworkers are forbidden to talk with the victim.
 Effects on personal reputation, e.g., unfounded rumors about the mobbing victim are circulated.
 Effects on occupational situation and quality of life, e.g., the victim is given meaningless jobs or tasks that affect the self-esteem.
 Effects on physical health, e.g., threats of physical violence, damage to the workplace, or outright sexual harassment.

Completeness 
The 45 mobbing actions are derived by Leymann from 300 individual interviews in the years of 1981 to 1984. After 1984 the interviews did not find further actions and ended.

Legal aspects

See also

References 
 Leymann, Heinz (1990). Handbok för användning av LIPT-formuläret för kartläggning av risker för psykiskt våld (Manual of the LIPT questionnaire for assessing the risk of psychological violence at work). Stockholm: Violen.
 Leymann, Heinz (1990). Mobbing and Psychological Terror at Workplaces. Violence and Victims 5(2), pp. 119-126.

Further reading 
 Kohut, Margaret R. (2008). The Complete Guide to Understanding, Controlling, and Stopping Bullies & Bullying at Work: A Complete Guide for Managers, Supervisors, and Co-Workers. Atlantic Publishing Group Inc., .

External links 
 Albrecht Leymann Inventory of Psychological Terror

Organizational behavior
Abuse
Deviance (sociology)
Workplace bullying
Psychological tests and scales